Mongol Shuudan (Монгол Шуудан) is

 the postal system of Mongolia
 a Russian rock band named Mongol Shuudan